The Monroe State Bank Building, located in Monroe, Oregon, is a building listed on the National Register of Historic Places.  When it opened in 1911 it was headquarters of the only bank established in southeast Benton County, Oregon.

It is a two-story building which "dominates" Monroe's business district from its corner of South Fifth and Commercial streets.

This building has served as the telephone company and also as the home of the South Benton County Community Museum.

In 1992 the building was vacant and restoration was planned.

See also
 National Register of Historic Places listings in Benton County, Oregon

References

1911 establishments in Oregon
Bank buildings on the National Register of Historic Places in Oregon
Buildings designated early commercial in the National Register of Historic Places
Commercial buildings completed in 1911
National Register of Historic Places in Benton County, Oregon